The Brazil Formation is a geologic formation in Indiana consisting of shale, sandstone, clay, and coal. It preserves fossils dating back to the Carboniferous period

Description

The Brazil Formation was named in 1902 for the city of Brazil, located in Clay County, Indiana. It originally included rocks between the bottom of the Petersburg Coal and the top of the Mansfield Sandstone. In 1922, a new survey resulted in restrictions to include only rocks between the Lower Block Coal Member and what was at the time called Coal II. In 1976, it was amended again to include rocks between the upper part of Minshall Coal Member and the lower part of Lower Block Coal Member.

The formation is made up of shale, sandstone, clay, and coal. Thickness is measured between 40 to 90 feet.

See also
 List of fossiliferous stratigraphic units in Indiana

References

 

Carboniferous Indiana
Carboniferous southern paleotropical deposits